Elvia Andreoli (4 January 1950 or 2 January 1951 – 28 March 2020) was an Argentine film actress of Sicilian, Jewish and Spanish descent. She appeared in over 30 films between 1965 and 1998.

She starred in films such as Aquellos años locos (1971), Así no hay cama que aguante (1980), Atrapadas (1984), Apartment Zero (1998) and Asesinato a distancia (1998). She died on 28 March 2020.

Filmography
Asesinato a distancia (1998) .... Regina
Minuto, treinta y dos segundos, Un (1992) (TV)
Prisioneras del Terror (1991) (not released)
Apartment Zero (1988) .... Adrian's Mother
Sentimientos: Mirta de Liniers a Estambul (1987)
Obsesión de venganza (1987)
"Valeria" (1987) TV Series .... Deborah
Sin querer, queriendo (1985)
Telo y la tele, El (1985)
"Rossé" (1985) TV Series .... Beatriz
Atrapadas (1984) .... Olga
... aka Condemned to Hell (USA)
"Amo y señor" (1984) TV Series .... Nora
¿Somos? (1982)
... aka Are We? (USA)
Departamento compartido (1980)
A los cirujanos se les va la mano (1980)
Así no hay cama que aguante (1980)
Noche viene movida, La (1980)
Las Muñecas que hacen pum (1979)
Aquellos años locos (1971) (as Elvia Evans)
¡Qué noche de casamiento! (1969) (as Elvia Evans)
La Cama (1968) (as Elvia Evans)
La Casa de Madame Lulù (1968) (as Elvia Evans)
Coche cama alojamiento (1968) .... Bailarina
Mannequín... alta tensión (1968)
Escándalo en la familia (1967)
Ritmo nuevo y vieja ola (1965)

References

External links
 

1950s births
2020 deaths
Argentine film actresses
Argentine people of Spanish descent
Argentine people of Sicilian descent
Jewish Argentine actresses
Year of birth missing
Place of birth missing